Blecua y Torres is a municipality located in the province of Huesca, Aragon, Spain. According to the 2009 census (INE), the municipality has a population of 189 inhabitants.

References

Municipalities in the Province of Huesca